Blutwurz is a liqueur made from the root of the common tormentil plant (Potentilla erecta), which derives its German name (blood root) from the color of the juice that emerges when the root is cut. The root provided a traditional anti-inflammatory medicine. Today it is still consumed in the form of tea, syrup, cream, or powder. Most importantly, the Penninger company uses Blutwurz as the key ingredient of an herbal liqueur or Bitters that the company produces in Bavaria.

The liqueur is 50% alcohol by volume. To give the liqueur its distinctive taste, Penninger first macerates the root, steeping it in alcohol for some four to five weeks. The resulting liquid is then filtered. The non-use of distillation extracts the root's essential oils, while preserving its flavor and color. One may consume the liqueur as an apéritif, digestif, or ingredient in a cocktail.

Producers (non-exhaustive list):
Penninger: Alte Hausbrennerei Penninger GmbH
Hieke Zwiesel: Heinrich Hieke GmbH
Bärwurz-Quelle:Bad Kötztinger Bärwurz-Quelle
Schlosskellerei Ramelsberg: Schlosskellerei Ramelsberg Betriebs GmbH

German alcoholic drinks
Bitters
Herbal liqueurs
German brands